Ratnagiri Fort, also called Ratnadurg Fort or Bhagawati Fort, is a fort located 2 km from Ratnagiri, in Ratnagiri district, of Maharashtra. This fort is an important fort in Ratnagiri district. The fort is a main tourist attraction due to the Bhagawati Temple inside the fort.

History 
This fort was built during the Bahamani period. In 1670 Maratha King Shivaji won the fort from the hands of Adil Shah of Bijapur. King Shivaji had built protecting towers on two commanding points, one at the south and the other near the old court house. The Citadel defense was improved by maratha admiral Kanhoji Angre in 1750–1755. Dhondu Bhaskar Pratinidhi did some minor repairs to the fort during Peshwa regime (1755–1818). The fort was later won by the British in 1818. The temple of Bhagavati was renovated in 1950.

How to reach 
The nearest town is Ratnagiri. The fort is at walkable distance from the town. A wide road leads to the entrance gate of the fort. It takes about an hour to have a walk around the fort.

Places to see 

The lighthouse is situated on one side of the fort. Inside the fort is Bhagawati temple, a pond and a well. There is a cave below the fort. The strongest of all the bastion is Rede Buruj.

See also 
 List of forts in Maharashtra
 List of forts in India
 Kanhoji Angre
 Marathi people
 Maratha Navy
 List of Maratha dynasties and states
 Maratha War of Independence
 Battles involving the Maratha Empire
 Military history of India
 List of people involved in the Maratha Empire

References 

Maratha Navy
Buildings and structures of the Maratha Empire
Forts in Ratnagiri district
16th-century forts in India
Caves of Maharashtra
Tourist attractions in Konkan
Former populated places in India
Ratnagiri
Tourist attractions in Maharashtra